The 1966 Turkish presidential election is the presidential election held in the Grand National Assembly of Turkey on March 28, 1966. 532 out of 634 deputies participated in the elections held after the 4th President Cemal Gürsel, was dismissed by the Grand National Assembly of Turkey due to his health problems. Cevdet Sunay, Chief of General Staff of the Turkish Armed Forces, was elected to the presidency with 461 votes in the first round.

Election

References 

1966 elections in Turkey
Presidential elections in Turkey